In telecommunication, continuous operation is an operation in which certain components, such as nodes, facilities, circuits, or equipment, are in an operational state at all times. Continuous operation usually requires that there be fully redundant configuration, or at least a sufficient X out of Y degree of redundancy for compatible equipment, where X is the number of spare components and Y is the number of operational components. 

Telecommunications engineering
Reliability engineering